The American Anti-Slavery Almanac was published yearly from 1836 to 1843 by the American Anti-Slavery Society, as one of the Society's efforts to raise awareness of the realities of slavery in nineteenth century America. The yearly almanac compiled calendars and astronomical data with anti-slavery literature, art, and advertisements. in a small, neat pamphlet. For instance, the 1843 edition included works from authors such as William Lloyd Garrison and Thomas Moore as well as accounts of recent slave rebellions and quotes from political speeches supporting the abolition of slavery. The almanac did not call for uprising or violence, but rather served as a means to spread the word about the anti-slavery cause.

Editions 
The almanac had different editors and publishers under the American Anti-Slavery society depending on the edition and the publication location. The authors were part of the American Anti-Slavery Society, such as Lydia Maria Child, an abolitionist and women's rights advocate who served on the American Anti-Slavery society board during the 1840s and 1850s. Child compiled the American Anti-Slavery Almanac for 1843, which includes a page on the National Anti-Slavery Standard, a publication she also edited. Other authors include Isaac Knapp (1838, Boston) and S. W Benedict (1842, Boston).

1836 
Published in Boston, Massachusetts. Published by "Webster & Southard".

1837 
Published in Cincinnati, Ohio. Published by the Ohio Anti-Slavery Society

1838 
Published in Boston, Massachusetts. Published by Isaac Knapp, who partnered with William Lloyd Garrison to publish the Liberator, an abolitionist newspaper.

1839 
Published in New York, New York and Boston, Massachusetts. Published by Isaac Knapp and S.W. Benedict.

1840 
Published in New York, New York and Boston, Massachusetts. Published by American Anti-Slavery Society.

1842 
Published in Boston, Massachusetts. Published by S.W. Benedict.

1843 
Published in New York, New York. Published (compiled) by Lydia Maria Child.

Publishing 
The almanac was published by the American Anti-Slavery Society, who also published the weekly newspaper, the National Anti-Slavery Standard. Some of the publication locations include New York, Philadelphia, and Boston. There was also a 1837 edition published in Cincinnati, Ohio.

References

External links 

 Gallery of pictures from the editions of 1838 and 1839 at the University of Virginia

American Anti-Slavery Society
Almanacs
Abolitionist newspapers published in the United States
Publications established in 1836
Defunct mass media in the United States
1836 establishments in the United States